Hugo Roussey (born 2 January 1997) is a French footballer who plays as a striker for Championnat National 2 club Thonon Evian.

Club career 
Roussey is a youth exponent from Saint-Étienne. He made his Coupe de la Ligue debut on 16 December 2015 against Paris Saint-Germain. He played the full game.

References 

1997 births
Living people
French footballers
Association football forwards
Ligue 1 players
Championnat National 2 players
Championnat National 3 players
AS Saint-Étienne players
GOAL FC players
Louhans-Cuiseaux FC players
Thonon Evian Grand Genève F.C. players